United Nations Security Council Resolution 148, adopted unanimously on August 23, 1960, after examining the application of the Republic of Niger for membership in the United Nations, the Council recommended to the General Assembly that the Republic of Niger be admitted.

See also
List of United Nations Security Council Resolutions 101 to 200 (1953–1965)

References
Text of the Resolution at undocs.org

External links
 

 0148
History of Niger
Foreign relations of Niger
 0148
1960 in Niger
 0148
August 1960 events